Peter Hall (born June 5, 1949) is a sailor from Canada, who represented his country at the 1987 Pan American Games in Indianapolis, United States with team members Scott Morgan and Alain Boucher where they took the Silver medal in the Soling. Also at the 2018 Vintage Yachting Games in Hellerup Denmark, Hall as helmsman together with his fellow crew members Gord de Vries and Johan Offermans (The Netherlands) took the silver medal in the Soling. Hall is representing Group P in the council of World Sailing. Peter won so far four World Championships. Furthermore, he was president of the International Soling Association from 2015 - 2016.

Early life
He was born on June 5, 1949, in Montreal, Quebec, Hall attended the Lower Canada College at Monkland Village, and earned a Bachelor's degree in Business Administration from Queen's University at Kingston and a bachelor's degree in law from McGill University at Montreal.

Personal life 
Hall lives in Montreal, is married with Margot. The couple has 3 children: Krista, Nicolas and William.

Professional life
Hall is (semi-)retired from a career as lawyer and business developer at Pratt & Whitney Canada, CAE Flight Simulators, Bell Helicopter Canada, Lavalin Engineering, Teleglobe International, Caisse de dépôt et placement du Québec and Ingenium. Peter holds several board positions in the industry.

Sailing life

Peter started sailing early in life in several classes and is a life member of the Royal St. Lawrence Yacht Club, Montreal. On the age of 26 he switched to the Soling in pursuit for an Olympic ticket. Besides the Soling he also kept sailing Lightning. After a few years without the Soling he returned to the class in 2006. Hall holds several North American Championships titles in the Soling, in the Lightning he holds one World Champions title as well as two Master titles. In 2011, 2012 and 2014 he became World Champion in the Soling. In 2012 and 14, his youngest son William was a member of the team. In 2013, 2014 and 2016 Peter received the Soling World Trophy. Peter was also president of Voile Quebec from 1994 to 1996.
Peter Hall was inducted in 2017 to the Voile Québec Hall of Fame.

References

1949 births
Living people
Canadian male sailors (sport)
Lawyers from Montreal
Lightning class sailors
North American Champions Soling
Sportspeople from Montreal
Soling class world champions
World Sailing officials
Pan American Games silver medalists for Canada
Pan American Games medalists in sailing
Sailors at the 1987 Pan American Games
Medalists at the 1987 Pan American Games